Count  was a Japanese samurai daimyō of the late Edo period.  He was the head of Kokura Domain.

Ogasawara clan genealogy
Tadanobu was part of the senior branch of the Ogasawara clan.

Tadanobu's branch of the clan were daimyō at Kokura Domain (150,000 koku) in Buzen Province.

This was because the head of this clan line and his heirs were ennobled in 1884.

Events of Tadanobu's life
During Tadanobu's tenure as clan head, the Kokura domain took part in the shogunate's Chōshū Expeditions, and also destroyed Kokura Castle in 1866 during its retreat to Kawara. Komiya was the one who took charge of the burning of Kokura Castle and, as the castle was built by the clan's ancestor Ogasawara Tadazane, he committed seppuku in atonement.

For his deployment of troops on the Imperial side during the Boshin War of 1868, Tadanobu received a personal stipend of 5,000 koku from the court.

In the Meiji era, Tadanobu spent a few years studying in Britain, returning in 1878. He held junior 3rd court rank.

Ancestry

References

Further reading
 Nussbaum, Louis-Frédéric. (2002). "Ogasawara".  Japan Encyclopedia. Cambridge: Harvard University Press.   
 Varley, H. Paul. (1965).  The Onin War: History of Its Origins and Background with a Selective Translation of the Chronicle of Ōnin  New York Columbia University Press.  (cloth)

See also
 Biography of Tadanobu (September 28, 2007)

Kazoku
Ogasawara clan
1862 births
1897 deaths
Fudai daimyo